Goodes is a surname. Notable people with the surname include:

 Adam Goodes (born 1980), Australian professional Australian rules football player 
 Brett Goodes (born 1984), Australian professional Australian rules football player
 Guy Goodes (born 1971), British-Israeli basketball player and coach
 Herbert Goodes (died 1986), Australian public servant
 Melvin Goodes, Canadian businessman
 Mike Goodes (born 1956), American professional golfer
 Reg Goodes (1928-1996), Australian professional Australian rules football player 
 Reggie Goodes (born 1991), New Zealand rugby union player

See also 
 Form of the Good, Plato's macrocosmic view of goodness in living
 Good (disambiguation)
 Goode, surname
 Goodness (disambiguation)
 Goods (disambiguation)
 Good (surname)
 List of people known as the Good